The Fool of the World and the Flying Ship is a children's picturebook illustrated by Uri Shulevitz that retells a Russian fairy tale of the same name. The text is taken from Arthur Ransome's version of the story in the 1916 book Old Peter's Russian Tales; Ransome had collected the folktale when he was a journalist in Russia. The book was released in 1968 by Farrar, Straus and Giroux and won a Caldecott Medal for illustration in 1969.

Plot summary
The Czar announced that whoever brought him a flying ship could marry his daughter. The Fool of the World, the youngest son of a peasant couple, set out to marry the Princess.  His mother gave him "some crusts of dry black bread and a flask of water" in a bag for his trip.

The Fool met an "ancient old man" who asked to eat the Fool's food.  When the Fool opened his bag, he was surprised to find "fresh white rolls and cooked meats," as well as "corn brandy," which he shared.  The old man instructed the Fool to hit a tree with his hatchet to create a flying ship, but advised him to give a ride to everyone he met.

After making and flying his ship, the Fool picked up the Listener (who could hear very faint sounds), the Swift-goer (who could walk across the world in one step), the Far-shooter (who could hit a bird hundreds of miles away), the Eater (who could consume great quantities of food), the Drinker (who could swallow more than a lake at one time), a man carrying sticks of wood that could become soldiers, and a man carrying straw that could make everything cold.

The eight men landed at the Czar's place.  Although the Czar wanted the ship, he did not want the Princess to marry a moujik (peasant).  So the Czar gave five supposedly impossible tasks to the Fool and his men:
 Before the Czar had finished his dinner, he wanted "the magical water of life."  In response, the Swift-goer ran to find the water, but fell asleep. After the Listener located the Swift-goer, the Far-shooter shot a bullet close to Swift-goer's head, waking him up.  The Swift-goer returned with a bottle of the water.
 The Czar required the men to eat "twelve oxen roasted whole, and as much bread as can be baked in forty ovens."  The Eater considered the food "a little snack."
 The Czar commanded the men to drink 40 barrels of wine, which the Drinker gulped quickly.
 The Czar demanded that the Fool take a bath in a hot iron bathhouse to prepare for the wedding. The man with the straw accompanied the Fool and spread his straw, causing the bath water to freeze.
 The Czar stated that he wanted the Fool to show him "a regiment of soldiers" to defend the Princess. The man with the wood sticks scattered them around, causing a "gigantic army" to appear.

Having failed in his quest to get rid of the peasants, the Czar gave the Fool gifts and asked him to marry the Princess.  The Fool and the Princess fell in love with each other and were married, and the Fool "became so clever that all the court repeated everything he said."

Reception
In 1968 the book was selected for Fanfare, the Horn Book Magazine list of the best books of the year.  It won a Caldecott Medal in 1969.

Shulevitz's illustrations for the story were praised as "colorful, bold, spirited, and spontaneous."  However, the text has been criticized because the lead character has mental retardation that is "unrealistic" in that "he is magically cured from his simple mindedness and becomes highly respected by the people."

Selected translations
 Tontimundo y el Barco Volador: un Cuento Ruso (Spanish, 1991)
 Soratobu fune to sekai ichi no baka: Roshia no mukashibanashi Ruso (Japanese, 1991)
 Sesang e tul to ŏmnŭn pabo wa hanŭl ŭl nanŭn pae (Korean, 1997)
 L'Idiot du Village et le Vaisseau Volant: un Conte Russe (French, 2011)

References

External links
The Fool of the World and the Flying Ship by Arthur Ransome (Project Gutenberg EBook version)

1968 children's books
Caldecott Medal–winning works
Children's fiction books
American picture books
Farrar, Straus and Giroux books
Russian fairy tales